Prehistoric Women is a 1950 low-budget fantasy adventure film, written and directed by Gregg G. Tallas and starring Laurette Luez and Allan Nixon. It also features Joan Shawlee, Judy Landon, and Mara Lynn. Released by Alliance Productions, the independent film was also titled The Virgin Goddess. The film was later distributed in the United States as a double feature with Man Beast.

Prehistoric Women is similar to the 1940 film One Million B.C.
  
The film also acts as somewhat of a spiritual predecessor to the 1967 film of the same name (sometimes known as Slave Girls) starring Martine Beswick, although the two are otherwise unrelated.

Plot
Tigri (Luez) and her Stone Age friends, all of which are women, hate all men. However, she and her Amazon tribe see men as a "necessary evil" and capture them as potential husbands. Engor (Nixon), who is smarter than the rest of the men, is able to escape them. He discovers fire and battles enormous beasts. After he is recaptured by the women, he uses fire to drive off a dragon-like creature. The women are impressed with him, including their prehistoric queen. Engor marries Tigri and they begin a new, more civilized, tribe.

Cast 
 Laurette Luez as Tigri
 Allan Nixon as Engor
 Mara Lynn as Arva
 Joan Shawlee as Lotee
 Judy Landon as Eras
 Jo-Carroll Dennison as Nika

See also
 1950 in film

References

External links 

 
 
 
 

1950 films
1950s fantasy adventure films
American fantasy adventure films
Films set in prehistory
Eagle-Lion Films films
Cinecolor films
Films scored by Raoul Kraushaar
Films directed by Gregg G. Tallas
Prehistoric people in popular culture
1950s English-language films
1950s American films